Costumi d'Arte is an Italian costume atelier and supplier for theater, motion picture and television productions.

History
The first iteration of Costumi d'Arte was founded in Rome in 1815 by former soldier Angelo Pignotti. The original holdings of the company constituted a number of authentic 17th and 18th century garments. The company name Casa d'Arte was coined by Egisto Peruzzi, Pignotti's son-in-law, who took over the business and relocated it to Florence. Under Egisto's management, the company first began creating their own costumes, in addition to renting antique items.

By the 1920s, the company's costumes were being used extensively in film productions, as well as in regional productions. Giuseppe Peruzzi, the grandson of Egisto, opened a branch of Costumi d'Arte Perruzi in Rome in order to work more cohesively with studios like Cinecittà. Ownership was assumed by Giuseppe's son, Ruggero Peruzzi, when he died in 1955. By the mid 1960s, Costumi d'Arte was reaching an unprecedented international audience through films like,  The 300 Spartans, Prince of Foxes, The Golden Coach, A Farewell to Arms, Spartacus and The Cardinal.

In 2019, costume designer Maja Meschede has described Costumi d'Arte as being, along with Peruzzi and Tirelli, one of the best costume houses for 18th-century stock.

Partial Company filmography

References

External links
 Official Site
 Costumi d'Arte on the IMDb
 Costumi d'Arte Peruzzi on the IMDb
 Casa d'Arte di Firenze

Film organisations in Italy
Clothing companies of Italy
Manufacturing companies based in Florence
Companies based in Rome